Louise Hanna-Walker (born 21 March 1951) is a Canadian former athlete. She competed in the women's high jump at the 1972 Summer Olympics and the 1976 Summer Olympics. She won a silver medal at the 1974 Commonwealth Games, and another silver medal at the Pan American Games in 1975.

References

1951 births
Living people
Athletes (track and field) at the 1972 Summer Olympics
Athletes (track and field) at the 1976 Summer Olympics
Canadian female high jumpers
Olympic track and field athletes of Canada
Athletes (track and field) at the 1974 British Commonwealth Games
Commonwealth Games medallists in athletics
Commonwealth Games silver medallists for Canada
Athletes (track and field) at the 1975 Pan American Games
Pan American Games medalists in athletics (track and field)
Pan American Games silver medalists for Canada
Athletes from Toronto
Medalists at the 1975 Pan American Games
Medallists at the 1974 British Commonwealth Games